Samar Haroon Bilour is a Pakistani politician who had been a member of the Provincial Assembly of Khyber Pakhtunkhwa from October 2018 till January 2023.

Political career
Samar was elected to the Provincial Assembly of Khyber Pakhtunkhwa as a candidate of Awami National Party (ANP) from the constituency PK-78 in 2018 Pakistani by-elections held on 14 October 2018. She defeated Muhammad Irfan Abdul Salman of Pakistan Tehreek-e-Insaf (PTI). Samar garnered 20,916 votes while her closest rival secured 16,819 votes. With this election, Samar became the first woman to be elected on a general seat of Khyber Pakhtunkhwa assembly in sixteen years.
She became provincial Secretary Information of Awami National Party Khyber Pakhtunkhwa on 4 June 2020.

References

Living people
Awami National Party politicians
Politicians from Khyber Pakhtunkhwa
Year of birth missing (living people)
Women members of the Provincial Assembly of Khyber Pakhtunkhwa
Awami National Party MPAs (Khyber Pakhtunkhwa)